This is a list of video games for the Nintendo 3DS video game console that have sold or shipped at least one million copies. The best-selling game on the Nintendo 3DS is Mario Kart 7. First released in Japan on December 1, 2011, it went on to sell 18.97 million units worldwide.

There are a total of 57 Nintendo 3DS games on this list that are confirmed to have sold or shipped at least one million units. Of these, ten were developed by internal Nintendo development divisions. Of the 57 games on this list, 39 were published in one or more regions by Nintendo.

By September 30, 2022, 388.89 million total copies of games had been sold for the Nintendo 3DS.

List

Notes

References

External links
 Nintendo IR Information - Nintendo 3DS Software

 
Nintendo 3DS
Best-selling Nintendo 3DS video games